Ceiriog was a rural district in the administrative county of Denbighshire from 1935 to 1974. 

The rural district was formed by a County Review Order in 1935 from the merger of Chirk and Llansillin Rural districts. The district was named after the Ceiriog Valley.

The district contained nine civil parishes:
Chirk
Glyntraian
Llanarmon Dyffryn Ceiriog
Llanarmon Mynydd Mawr
Llangadwaladr
Llangedwyn
Llanrhaeadr ym Mochnant
Llansantffraid Glynceiriog
Llansilin 

The rural district was abolished in 1974 by the Local Government Act 1972, with its area becoming part of the district of Glyndŵr, one of six districts of Clwyd.

References
 Denbighshire Administrative County (Vision of Britain)

History of Denbighshire
History of Wrexham County Borough
Rural districts of Wales